William Royall Tyler (October 17, 1910 – November 16, 2003) was a United States diplomat.

Biography

William Royall Tyler was born in Paris in 1910.  His father Royall Tyler (1884–1953) was an American and a descendant of Royall Tyler (1757–1826).  His mother was an Italian, Countess Elisina de Castelvecchio.  His mother was the great-great-granddaughter of Louis Bonaparte, descending from Louis Bonaparte's illegitimate son François de Castelvecchio (1826–1869).  Tyler was educated at Balliol College, Oxford.

After college, Tyler spent five years working as an international banker in England and the United States.  He then enrolled in Harvard University, receiving a Master of Fine Arts  During World War II, Tyler worked in the United States Office of War Information, first in Algeria, and then as director of the Office of War Information in France.

After the war, Tyler joined the United States Foreign Service, becoming a career diplomat.  As a Foreign Service Officer, he was stationed in Paris, Bonn, and The Hague.  In 1962, President of the United States John F. Kennedy nominated Tyler as Assistant Secretary of State for European Affairs, and, after Senate confirmation, Tyler held this office from September 2, 1962 until May 18, 1965.  In 1965, President Lyndon B. Johnson named Tyler United States Ambassador to the Netherlands; Tyler held this post from June 23, 1965 through June 20, 1969.

Tyler left government service in 1969, becoming director of the Dumbarton Oaks Research Library and Collection, one of the world's foremost research libraries in the field of Byzantine studies.  He retired from this position in 1977.

In retirement, Tyler continued to live in Washington, D.C. until 2003, when he moved to Vermont.  He was a long-time member of the Cosmos Club.  He died at a nursing facility in Bristol, Vermont on November 16, 2003, after suffering from Alzheimer's and Parkinson's disease.  He was 93 years old.

References
Obituary in The Washington Post, Dec. 4, 2003, p. B.06.

1910 births
2003 deaths
United States Assistant Secretaries of State
Ambassadors of the United States to the Netherlands
Harvard Graduate School of Arts and Sciences alumni
Alumni of Balliol College, Oxford
American people of Italian descent
United States Foreign Service personnel
People of the United States Office of War Information